WNTI (990 AM) is an American radio station, licensed to serve Somerset, Pennsylvania; the seat of news/talk for Somerset County. The station broadcasts with a maximum output power of 10,000 watts during the day and greatly reduces power to 100 watts at night, using a two-tower directional antenna system. The station is a simulcast of WNTJ in Johnstown, Pennsylvania.

History: beginnings as WVSC
The very first radio station in Somerset County, this station signed on as WVSC on January 15, 1951. Operating as Somerset Broadcasting Co., the owners were T. H. Oppegard, President & General Manager, and Carl R. Lee, Sales Manager and Chief Engineer. The call letters stood for an acronym of "We're the Voice of Somerset County". The station for many years programmed a full-service format of news, sports, and talk, much of it local. The station was also the longtime local voice of ABC News, including the legendary Paul Harvey. WVSC was joined by an FM sister station, WVSC-FM, on June 15, 1966.

Purchase by Ridge Communications
On May 11, 1970, WVSC-AM-FM was purchased by Ridge Communications, headed by I. Richard Adams. It would be under Ridge Communications' ownership that WVSC would see its biggest growth.

WVSC managed to survive an aggressive new AM competitor, WADJ, which came on the air in 1981. That same year, Ridge Communications decided to expand its footprint by successfully applying for a license for a new AM station northwest of Somerset in Indiana County. However, Ridge was unable to raise the capital necessary to put the new WRID (which stood for RIDge Communications) AM 1520 in Homer City on the air, and the construction permit and license were sold to the newly formed Raymark Broadcasting, of Indiana. That station is known today as WCCS, which coincidentally was the original call letters for competing station WCCL, which had given up the WCCS call letters for WWZE.

In the mid-1980s, WVSC, which had been a daytime-only station for many years, successfully petitioned the FCC for limited nighttime power. WVSC began operating at 75 watts at night by the end of the decade.

Sale to Forever Broadcasting
In 1997, Ridge Communications decided to sell WVSC-AM-FM to Forever Broadcasting of Altoona, which had been looking for an FM property to expand its popular "Froggy" branded country music format to the Johnstown area. WVSC remained the same, while WVSC-FM took on new call letters and the country format and became known as "Froggy 98", the same moniker as its flagship station in Altoona. In 2004, WVSC gave up the final trace of its historic call sign when it began simulcasting the news/talk/sports format of its sister operation, WNTJ in Johnstown, and took on the call sign WNTW.

Sale to Seven Mountains Media
It was announced on October 12, 2022 that Forever Media is selling 34 stations, including WNTI, WNTJ, and the entire Johnstown cluster, to State College-based Seven Mountains Media for $17.3 million. The deal closed on January 2, 2023.

WLLI
WNTW continued to operate under the news/talk/sports format. However, the simulcast was expected to end by the end of 2007, as Forever Broadcasting agreed to sell WNTJ's AM 850 signal (which now bears the WKGE callsign) to Michigan-based Birach Broadcasting Corporation for $230,000. That sale was completed on April 10, 2008. As the sale included only the transmitting facility and license but not the programming or format, Forever Broadcasting moved the WNTJ format and call letters to the former WPRR at AM 1490 (which, ironically, was the original frequency of WNTJ). That station was owned by 2510 Licenses LLC but operated by Forever Broadcasting through a local marketing agreement until Forever Broadcasting reacquired the frequency outright at the end of April 2011. On January 9, 2013, the station changed its call sign from WNTW to WLLI with this change the simulcast with WNTJ was ended and the station became known as 990 the fanatic becoming a member of the CBS Sports Radio Network. In the spring of 2016, the simulcast with WNTJ returned. The station still airs Pittsburgh Pirates baseball, Pittsburgh Penguins hockey, Pittsburgh Steelers football, and local high school football as a part of the simulcast.

Previous use of WNTI
WNTI was until 2015 the FM station of Centenary College in Hackettstown, New Jersey. The station was taken over by WXPN, the University Pennsylvania station. The call sign was changed to WXPJ.

On January 16, 2017, WLLI changed its call sign to  WNTI.

References

External links

News and talk radio stations in the United States
NTI
Radio stations established in 1951
1951 establishments in Pennsylvania